Rodney is a former city in Jefferson County in southwest Mississippi, approximately  northeast of Natchez. Rodney was founded in 1828, and in the 19th century, it was only three votes away from becoming the capital of the Mississippi Territory. Its population declined to nearly zero after the Mississippi River changed course. The Rodney Center Historic District is listed on the National Register of Historic Places.

Today a small number of inhabitants remain, keeping Rodney alive as a hamlet though the internet considers it a ghost town. Reliable data is hard to find as the town is not listed as a separate entity by the census bureau, nor did Google Maps bother to visit it.

Early history
Rodney was originally settled by the French in January 1763 and named Petit Gouffre, meaning "Little Chasm". As a result of the French and Indian War, the area was taken by Great Britain. Spain would later control this area after taking West Florida from the British in 1781. Spain held the area until selling it to Thomas Calvit in 1798.  "In 1802, Judge Wm. B. Shields of Delaware was appointed to the Mississippi Territory and arrived at Rodney or "Petit Gulph" in the company of Judge Thomas Rodney, who was also of Delaware." The city was later renamed Rodney in 1828 in honor of Judge Thomas Rodney.

Structures

The Old Rodney Presbyterian Church was dedicated in 1832. It is located at the middle section of the town, across the Rodney – Red Lick – Lorman Road from Alston Grocery Store. Formerly at the south edge of the town was Sacred Heart Catholic Church, built in 1869. On the southeast corner of Rodney lies Alston's Grocery, operated by the Alston family since 1915.

Population
The 1850 United States Census listed the population of Rodney as 210.

Notable people
 James Cessor, member of the Mississippi House of Representatives from 1871 to 1877
 Thomas Hinds Duggan, former member of the Texas Senate
 Bill Foster, member of the Baseball Hall of Fame
 Charles Pasquale Greco, Bishop of Alexandria in Louisiana from 1946 to 1973 and Supreme Chaplain of the Knights of Columbus from 1961 to 1987
 Reuben C. Weddington, former member of the Arkansas House of Representatives

References

External links

RoadsideAmerica.com: Rodney, MS
MS history page on rootsweb.com
Blog about Rodney, MS

Federal architecture in Mississippi
Former populated places in Jefferson County, Mississippi
Ghost towns in Mississippi
Gothic Revival architecture in Mississippi
Populated places established in 1828
1828 establishments in Mississippi
Mississippi populated places on the Mississippi River